Jupiter Apple and Bibmo Presents: Bitter (also referred to by its shortened name Bitter) is a collaborative album between the Brazilian musicians Jupiter Apple and Bibiana "Bibmo" Morena, who also was his domestic partner at the time. It was released in February 2007 by Goiânia-based independent label Monstro Discos as a prelude to the musician's then-upcoming album Uma Tarde na Fruteira, scheduled to be released later that year by Elefant Records in Spain. Its raw, stripped-down sonority which contrasts with Jupiter Apple's previous releases was influenced by the likes of David Bowie, The Rolling Stones, The Stooges, Bob Dylan and The Kinks.

"Exactly" was re-recorded from Hisscivilization.

Track listing

Personnel
 Jupiter Apple – lead vocals, electric guitar, classical guitar, keyboards, percussion, production
 Bibiana "Bibmo" Morena – additional vocals, electric guitar, classical guitar
 Lucas Hanke – electric guitar, bass guitar
 Ray-Z – electric guitar
 Ed Dolzan – drums, percussion
 André Brasil – production

References

2007 albums
Collaborative albums